Tie One On! is a live EP by New Jersey punk band the Bouncing Souls. The first 8 tracks were recorded live at The Continental in New York City, and all live versions of songs that previously appeared on the two prior studio albums, Maniacal Laughter and Bouncing Souls. The ninth track was recorded in the studio and was later re-recorded for their next studio album, Hopeless Romantic.

Track listing
All tracks by The Bouncing Souls except where noted.
 "Say Anything" – 2:02
 "Lamar Vannoy" – 3:18
 "Kate Is Great" – 2:55
 "Chunksong" (Timmy Chunks, The Bouncing Souls) – 1:36
 "East Coast! Fuck You!" – 1:29
 "Argyle" – 3:44
 "Born to Lose" (Frankie Brown, Ted Daffan) – 2:51
 "Here We Go" – 2:19
 "Kid" – 3:04

Personnel
Greg Attonito – vocals
Pete "The Pete" Steinkopf – guitar
Bryan "Papillon" Keinlen – bass, artwork
Shal Khichi – drums

References

The Bouncing Souls albums
1998 EPs
1998 live albums
Live EPs
Epitaph Records live albums
Epitaph Records EPs